The Reply is a legal document written by a Party specifically replying to a Responsive Declaration and in some cases an Answer.  A Reply may be written when a Party or non-moving Party (the Party who is not requesting relief from the court) is asserting a counterclaim or the court has ordered a Reply.

A Reply, specifically in California, may be written, filed and served, when a party files a motion or Request for an Order, the non-moving party files a Responsive Declaration, then the moving-party wants to file a legal document specifically 'replying' to the Responsive Declaration. (http://leginfo.legislature.ca.gov/faces/codes_displayText.xhtml?lawCode=CCP&division=&title=14.&part=2.&chapter=4.&article=).

It is important to keep in mind that "plaintiff" in this context may also refer to an impleaded party.  So, if a defendant impleads a party, this new party is the third-party defendant and the original defendant is the third-party plaintiff.  The third-party plaintiff must file a complaint on the third-party defendant, who then must answer.  The court may order a reply to this third-party defendant's answer.

In California, the filing of a Reply is subject to CCP 1005 (http://leginfo.legislature.ca.gov/faces/codes_displayText.xhtml?lawCode=CCP&division=&title=14.&part=2.&chapter=4.&article=) and the Reply should be filed and served pursuant to these rules - typically five court days prior to a hearing see California CCP 1005 (b) (http://leginfo.legislature.ca.gov/faces/codes_displayText.xhtml?lawCode=CCP&division=&title=14.&part=2.&chapter=4.&article=).

American legal terminology
Civil procedure legal terminology